Vinciguerra's lipinia (Lipinia relicta) is a species of skink found in Indonesia.

References

Lipinia
Reptiles described in 1892
Taxa named by Decio Vinciguerra